Chapal Skymark is an under-construction tower in Karachi, expected to become Pakistan's tallest residential skyscraper. It will have 50 stories with an expected height of 210m.

References 

Skyscrapers in Karachi
Towers in Karachi
Office buildings in Karachi
Bahria Town
Residential skyscrapers in Pakistan
Skyscraper office buildings